Ian Ross Tomlinson (27 February 1936 – 26 January 1995) was an Olympic athlete from Australia. He specialised in the triple jump and long jump events during his career.

Born in Perth, Western Australia Tomlinson represented Australia at two consecutive Olympic Games, starting in 1960. He twice claimed the gold medal in the men's triple jump event at the British Empire and Commonwealth Games for his native country: 1958 and 1962.

Tomlinson died in Melbourne, Victoria, aged 58.

References
 

1936 births
1995 deaths
Athletes from Perth, Western Australia
Sportsmen from Western Australia
Australian male long jumpers
Australian male triple jumpers
Olympic male long jumpers
Olympic male triple jumpers
Olympic athletes of Australia
Athletes (track and field) at the 1960 Summer Olympics
Athletes (track and field) at the 1964 Summer Olympics
Commonwealth Games gold medallists for Australia
Commonwealth Games gold medallists in athletics
Athletes (track and field) at the 1958 British Empire and Commonwealth Games
Athletes (track and field) at the 1962 British Empire and Commonwealth Games
Australian Athletics Championships winners
Japan Championships in Athletics winners
Commonwealth Games competitors for Australia
Medallists at the 1958 British Empire and Commonwealth Games
Medallists at the 1962 British Empire and Commonwealth Games